Bison antiquus, the antique bison or ancient bison, is an extinct species of bison that lived in Late Pleistocene North America until around 10,000 years ago. It was one of the most common large herbivores on the North American continent during the late Pleistocene, and is a direct ancestor of the living American bison along with Bison occidentalis.

History 
The first described remains of Bison antiquus were collected at Big Bone Lick, Kentucky in Pleistocene deposits in the 1850s and only consisted of a fragmentary posterior skull and a nearly complete horn core. The fossil (ANSP 12990) was briefly described by Joseph Leidy in 1852. Although the original fossils were fragmentary, a complete skull of an old male was discovered in southern California and were described as a new species, B. californicus, by Samuel Rhoads in 1897, but the species is considered synonymous with B. antiquus. Since the 19th century, several well preserved specimens of B. antiquus have been discovered in many parts of the United States, Canada, and southern Mexico.

Biology
During the later Pleistocene epoch, between 240,000 and 220,000 years ago, steppe wisent (B. priscus) migrated from Siberia into Alaska across the Bering Land Bridge. Bison priscus lived throughout North America from Alaska to southern Mexico throughout the remainder of the Pleistocene. In western North America, B. priscus evolved into long-horned bison, B. latifrons, which then evolved into B. antiquus. The larger B. latifrons appears to have disappeared by about 22,000 years ago likely because of evolutionary process to adapt into the new continent including increasing in population size. After the extinction of B. latifrons, B. antiquus became increasingly abundant in parts of midcontinent North America from 18,000 until about 10,000 years ago, after which the species appears to have given rise to the living species, B. bison. B. antiquus is the most commonly recovered large mammalian herbivore from the La Brea tar pits.

B. antiquus was taller, had larger bones and horns, and was 15-25% larger overall than modern bison. From tip to tip, the horns of B. antiquus measured about 3 ft (nearly 1 m).

A number of paleo-Indian spear and projectile points have been recovered in conjunction with the animal skeletons at the site, which is dated around 9,700 to 10,000 years ago. The reason for the "die-off" of so many animals in one compact location is still in conjecture; some professionals argue it was the result of a very successful paleo-Indian hunt, while others feel the herd died as a result of some dramatic natural event, to be later scavenged by humans. Individuals of B. antiquus of both sexes and a typical range of ages have been found at the site.

According to internationally renowned archaeologist George Carr Frison, B. occidentalis and B. antiquus both survived the Late Pleistocene period, between about 12,000 and 11,000 years ago, dominated by glaciation (the Wisconsin glaciation in North America), when many other megafauna became extinct. After the extinction of most of the North American megafauna, Native Americans of the Plains and Rocky Mountains depended largely on bison as their major food source. Frison noted, "[the] oldest, well-documented bison kills by pedestrian human hunters in North America date to about 11,000 years ago." B. antiquus fossils were found in Washington State in recent years, with apparent fracture patterns on bones consistent with stone tools as opposed to carnivorous activity.

References

Further reading

External links 

  
Paleobiology Database - Bison antiquus(dead link)

Bison
Extinct animals of the United States
Pleistocene even-toed ungulates
Pleistocene species extinctions
Prehistoric bovids
Prehistoric mammals of North America
Mammals described in 1852
Fossil taxa described in 1852
Extinct animals of Canada
Taxa named by Joseph Leidy